The Hummer H3 is an off-road vehicle that was produced from 2005 to 2010 by General Motors. The smallest model of the Hummer lineup, it was offered as a 5-door SUV or a 4-door pickup truck known as the H3T. Unlike the larger H1 and H2 models, the H3 was not developed by AM General.  It was introduced for the 2006 model year, based on a modified GMT355 that underpinned the Chevrolet Colorado/GMC Canyon compact pickup trucks that were also built at GM's Shreveport Operations in Shreveport, Louisiana and the Port Elizabeth plant in South Africa. While mechanically related to the Colorado and Canyon, GM claims they share only 10% of their components, with the chassis modified and reinforced for heavy off-road duties.

Powertrains 

In 2007, a H3X edition was added. It included the luxury package, 18-inch chrome wheels with unique center caps, chrome trim, chrome tube steps, a body-colored grille and a hard tire cover. The H3X also came with exclusive colors of Sonoma Red Metallic or Desert Orange Metallic.

Capabilities 

The H3 featured a two-speed, electronically controlled full-time four-wheel drive system that made it for both on-road and off-road driving. Electronic locking front and rear differentials were optional. Standard ground clearance with the 31-inch tires was  while the approach, departure, and breakover angles were 37.4°, 34.7°, and 22.1° respectively, allowing the H3 to scale a  vertical wall and negotiate grades of 60% and side slopes of 40%. Front and rear recovery hooks were standard, with an optional trailer hitch and wiring harness. The H3 features a traction control that can use the brakes independently to stop wheelspin and improve traction while adjusting to road conditions. It is also equipped with Stabilitrak stability control and ABS with variable brake force distribution assist.

The optional Adventure or Off Road package included 33-inch tires, off-road shocks, differential lockers and 4:1 low range gearing. These upgrades increased ground clearance, suspension articulation, approach and departure angles, and increased the H3's undercarriage protection.

Cargo volume with the second-row seats in the upright position was  that could be expanded to a maximum of  when the seats are folded down. The V8 models featured the least payload capacity of just over  while the straight-5, manual transmission models were rated at  payload.

Safety 
Electronic stability control, anti-lock four-wheel disc brakes, brake-controlled traction control, LATCH child-seat anchors, and tire-pressure monitoring were standard features on the H3. Side-curtain airbags were optional until 2008 when they were made standard across. The H3 was rated Acceptable, the second highest rating, by the Insurance Institute for Highway Safety in both frontal offset and side-impact crashes (with side airbags) and Poor, the lowest rating, for rear-crash protection/head restraints.

The U.S. National Highway Traffic Safety Administration (NHTSA) gave the 2008 H3 the following scores:
 Frontal Driver: 
 Frontal Passenger: 
 Side Driver: 
 Side Rear Passenger: 
 AWD Rollover:

H3T 

The Hummer H3T is a mid-size pickup truck that was available during the 2009 and 2010 model years.

The vehicle was originally developed as a regular cab (two-door) concept pickup truck in 2003, that was shown at the 2004 Los Angeles Auto Show. The five-passenger four-door crew-cab production version appeared at the 2008 Chicago Auto Show.
The H3T featured a 5-foot bed with built-in storage boxes and came in standard H3T, H3T Adventure, H3T Luxury, and H3T Alpha (with cloth or leather trim) trim packages.

A road test by Motor Trend reported the 2009 truck "crawled up rock steps, ran through sand washes, and navigated steep ledges with confidence and capability to spare." They described its turning radius "uncomfortably wide" and said "at highway cruising it would've been nice to have a faster, firmer feel.

Features and options

The Hummer H3 and H3T were intended to be a smaller and more affordable version of the larger Hummer H2 and H2 SUT. Therefore, many of the luxury features that were standard on the H2 and H2 SUT were optional on the H3 and H3T.

Even though the Hummer H3 and H3T were not as luxurious as their H2 and H2 SUT counterparts, they still came well-equipped. Standard features included alloy wheels, leather-wrapped steering wheel, premium cloth seating surfaces, an A/M-F/M-CD player audio system with a six-speaker audio system, keyless entry, power windows and door locks, air conditioning, four-wheel-drive, a five-speed manual transmission, dual front bucket seats, a folding rear bench seat, aluminum interior trim, a Driver Information Center (DIC) in the gauge cluster, and a 3.5L Inline Five-Cylinder (I5) gasoline engine.

Options available on the H3 and H3T included chrome-clad alloy wheels, additional chrome exterior trim, AM/FM radio with single-CD player with MP3 capability (later, an AM/FM stereo with an in dash 6-disc changer with MP3 capability) radios with auxiliary audio inputs, a touchscreen GPS navigation system, SiriusXM Satellite Radio, OnStar, remote vehicle start, a security system, luxury leather-trimmed seating surfaces with dual heated front bucket seats, a dual-zone climate control system, a Bluetooth hands-free phone system (later models only), a Monsoon premium audio system with amplifier and subwoofer, an automatic transmission, and a 5.3L Vortec V8 gasoline engine (H3 Alpha and H3T Alpha only).

Yearly U.S. sales

International markets 
In 2007, GM South Africa launched Hummer production in Port Elizabeth. The plant manufactured the Hummer H3 for the South African market, as well as units exported to Europe, Asia and Australia. In Australia, Hummer vehicles were only sold by special Holden-Saab-Hummer dealerships.

The H3 was qualified in 2010 by the Japanese Transport Ministry for tax breaks that set easier fuel efficiency standards for heavier vehicles. The  H3's  average in city traffic cleared the required Japanese emissions standards relative to its weight. A total of 723 Hummers were sold in Japan during the 12 months before March 2009.

Motorsports
Robby Gordon competed in the 2010 Dakar Rally in a purpose built, tube frame chassis H3, finishing eighth overall.

Plug-in hybrid 
In early 2009, Raser Technologies and FEV built a prototype plug-in hybrid H3 that could achieve up to 100 MPG equivalent, using its battery. This vehicle was renamed the Electric Hummer H3, and later showcased by California State Governor Arnold Schwarzenegger at a press conference at the State Capitol in Sacramento as part of a campaign to promote greener vehicles.

Discontinuation
At the end of February 2010, General Motors announced it would discontinue the Hummer brand. After filling a rental-car fleet order, the last Hummer H3T rolled off the assembly line at Shreveport on May 24, 2010.

References

External links 

Cars introduced in 2005
All-wheel-drive vehicles
H3
Mid-size sport utility vehicles
Sport utility trucks
Motor vehicles manufactured in the United States
Retro-style automobiles